The University of Maine at Augusta (UMaine Augusta or UMA) is a public college in Augusta, Maine. It is part of the University of Maine System. UMA provides baccalaureate and select associate degrees for residents of Central Maine. The university has campuses in Augusta and Bangor, and courses offered online and across the state.

History
The University of Maine at Augusta was established in 1965 by an act of the 102nd Maine Legislature as a continuing education division of the University of Maine.  In September, 1967, it was approved as a campus of the University of Maine and began offering day and evening classes. In 1971, it became a separate campus in the University of Maine system. In 1995, the University of Maine System Board of Trustees added University College of Bangor (UCB) to UMA.
The university now has nine locations besides the Augusta campus, in Bangor, Brunswick, East Millinocket, Ellsworth, Houlton, Lewiston, Rockland, Rumford and Saco.

Academics
The University of Maine at Augusta is divided into two primary academic colleges: College of Arts and Sciences and College of Professional Studies.  Each college is an academic division of the institution, which through its dean has administrative responsibilities. Colleges are organized into departments/programs, each representing an academic discipline (e.g. Architecture, Mathematics, and Nursing) or a related set of disciplines (e.g. Business, Humanities, and Natural Sciences). UMA offers 17 baccalaureate degrees, 15 associate degrees, and 13 non-degree cert programs.

UMA is noted nationally for offering an online baccalaureate degree in information and library science. In Summer 2009, it began offering online courses to a Maine Army National Guard unit stationed in Kandahar, Afghanistan. UMA is also noted for its aviation program.

Athletics 
Maine–Augusta (UMA) athletic teams are the Moose. The university is a member of the United States Collegiate Athletic Association (USCAA), primarily competing in the Yankee Small College Conference (YSCC) since the 2011–12 academic year. The Moose previously participated in the Sunrise Athletic Conference of the National Association of Intercollegiate Athletics (NAIA) from 2002–03 to 2010–11.

Maine–Augusta (UMA) competes in 11 intercollegiate varsity sports: Men's sports include basketball, cross country, soccer and track & field (outdoor); while women's sports include basketball, cross country, soccer and track & field (outdoor); and co-ed sports include, bowling, eSports and golf.

References

External links
 Official website
 Official athletics website

 
Educational institutions established in 1965
Augusta
University of Maine at Augusta
Universities and colleges in Kennebec County, Maine
University of Maine at Augusta
Buildings and structures in Augusta, Maine
USCAA member institutions
University of Maine Augusta
1965 establishments in Maine